"Little Old Fashioned Karma" is a song written and recorded by American country music artist Willie Nelson.  It was released in March 1983 as the first single from the album Tougher Than Leather.  The song reached number 10 on the Billboard Hot Country Singles & Tracks chart.

Chart performance

References

1983 singles
1983 songs
Willie Nelson songs
Songs written by Willie Nelson
Columbia Records singles